Albert Rothstein (known by the aliases Nuklon and Atom Smasher) is a superhero appearing in American comic books published by DC Comics. Atom Smasher is known for his power of growth and super strength.

The character made its live-action debut in The Flash, played by Adam Copeland. The character appears in the DC Extended Universe film Black Adam (2022), portrayed by Noah Centineo.

Publication history
Created by Roy Thomas and Jerry Ordway, he first appeared in The All-Star Squadron #25 (September 1983). Thomas chose his name as a tribute to his friend and fellow comic book fan Allan Rothstein.

Fictional character biography

Origin
The godson of Al Pratt, the Golden Age Atom, Albert Rothstein acquired his metahuman powers of super strength and control over his molecular structure, allowing him to alter the size and density of his body, from his grandfather, a reluctant supervillain known as Cyclotron. This allowed him to fight crime first as Nuklon, and then, later, as Atom Smasher. As Nuklon, Albert was a charter member of Infinity, Inc. and subsequently served in the Justice League. He was considered a dependable, but rather insecure and indecisive superhero while in Infinity, Inc. During this time he had a mohawk haircut. While in the JLA, he forged a strong friendship with fellow former Infinity Inc. teammate Obsidian.

The Justice Society

Albert finally gets his dream and is invited to join the reunited JSA under his new name and identity, Atom Smasher. For years, Atom Smasher cherishes his role in upholding Pratt's legacy and constantly seeks to prove himself worthy to his Golden Age idols – especially when many of them became his teammates in the JSA. He looks up to the elder JSA members, but is himself looked up to by young rookie member Stargirl. When Albert's mother is murdered in a plane crash engineered by the terrorist Kobra, he becomes consumed by vengeance, nearly crushing Kobra in his hands before he is talked down by his teammate Jack Knight, who convinces him that he should not taint the memory of his mother by associating it with Kobra's murder. Not long after the fatal crash, Albert – with the aid of Metron of the New Gods – goes back in time and forces the weakened villain Extant into a position where he takes the place of Albert's mother on the plane. This ends up saving her life but makes Albert a murderer, even if there was no other way to contain Extant and to stop him from causing further harm, and also ensures that history is preserved in terms of the number of deaths on the plane.

Black Adam
When Captain Marvel's longtime adversary Black Adam reforms and joins the JSA, he and Rothstein develop a rivalry at first as Al refuses to believe Adam has reformed. This soon turns to kinship after Adam justifies Al's murderous actions towards Extant. Indeed, Black Adam comments that he thinks of Atom Smasher as the brother he never had. Encouraged by Adam, Atom Smasher grows frustrated with the JSA's moral boundaries, especially when Kobra blackmails authorities into granting his release. Albert and Adam promptly quit the JSA after Kobra's escape.

Shortly thereafter, the unlikely duo settle each other's personal scores. Adam kills Kobra, while Rothstein kills the dictatorial president of Khandaq, Adam's home country. Atom Smasher helps lead a team of rogue metahumans (including former Infinity Inc. teammates Brainwave and Northwind) in an invasion of Khandaq and overthrow its oppressive regime. Atom Smasher initially fights against his JSA teammates in Khandaq before deciding instead to help forge an uneasy truce—Black Adam and his compatriots can remain in power so long as they never leave the country.

Atom Smasher remains in the Middle Eastern nation for a time, although he eventually begins to question Adam's motives. Rothstein perishes in JSA #75 while fighting against the Spectre, but is revived by Black Adam's lightning, and carried back to JSA headquarters.

He is later put on trial for his actions in Khandaq and pleads guilty to all charges. Teammate Stargirl promises to "be there for him" when he gets out. Whilst in jail, he is approached by the founder of the Suicide Squad, Amanda Waller. In 52, he is seen assembling a new Suicide Squad under Waller's orders, instructed to fight Black Adam, and, unbeknownst to Atom Smasher himself, push his family to overreact. They succeed, and Osiris is disgraced and exposed for having killed a Squad member, as Amanda Waller was filming the events, leading to the downfall of the whole Black Marvel Family, and a murderous rampage of Black Adam, dubbed World War III.

He then sides with the Justice Society, trying to apprehend Black Adam, but refuses to condemn him in any way, not even believing him guilty of the genocide in Bialya. When Adam is robbed of his powers by Captain Marvel, and is about to plunge to his death, it is Atom Smasher who saves him, though no character ever sees this, and Al keeps it hidden.

In the Black Adam: The Dark Age series, Albert is shown searching for his former friend, who is intent upon resurrecting his dead wife Isis. In Black Adam #5, Albert brings Adam a bone from Isis' remains and tries unsuccessfully to persuade his friend to go into hiding.

Modern-day JSA issues
In the Justice Society of America: The Kingdom special, Stargirl recruits Atom Smasher to knock some sense into Damage, who has become an evangelist of sorts for the Third World god Gog after the cosmic being (temporarily) healed his scarred face. He views Pratt's son as a brother figure, since he was brought up by Pratt in the first place.

Atom Smasher finally returns to the JSA during the "Black Adam and Isis" arc printed in Justice Society of America #23–25. Asking the team for a second chance at honoring the memory of Al Pratt, Atom Smasher joins the Justice Society in battling Black Adam and Isis, who have robbed Captain Marvel of his powers and his throne at the Rock of Eternity. At the conclusion of the story, despite Wildcat's distrust, Atom Smasher is readmitted into the JSA as a full member, along with all the other members of the team who had acted poorly in recent issues. He vanishes for several issues, but he reappears in the JSA: All-Stars book as a victim of kidnapping.

In the "Watchmen" sequel "Doomsday Clock", Atom Smasher returns to the DC Universe alongside the rest of the Justice Society of America when Doctor Manhattan, inspired by Superman, undoes the changes that he made to the timeline that erased the Justice Society of America and the Legion of Super-Heroes.

Powers and abilities
Already super strong at his normal size — 7 ft 6 in, or 2.3 m (though recently he has been depicted as being of a more normal height when not using his powers), Atom Smasher's strength and density increase proportionately to whatever size he chooses (it was explained in JSA #75 that his muscles and bones actually break and reform as they grow to achieve these great heights).

In the DC Encyclopedia, it is stated that he could grow up to 60 feet without problems.  Whether there is a limit to the heights he can grow to is unknown. At 60 feet, he was strong enough to knock out Power Girl with one stomp, and easily decimated most of the JSA during "Black Reign", but he is vulnerable to super-strong punches from the likes of Black Adam, being knocked unconscious with one blow several times. During his time as Nuklon, Albert was able to phase through walls; he has not been shown using this power in recent years, but it is unclear whether it has been retconned away. Rothstein is also a skilled pilot and mechanic. In the first few years of JSA, he could be seen piloting the JSA's jet, the Steel Eagle, as well as the Star Rocket Racer in JSA: Our Worlds at War, and earlier being Infinity, Inc.'s primary pilot.

Relationships with women
Albert has had complicated relationships with women during his tenure on various super-hero teams. While on Infinity, Inc., he was shown to be clearly in love with teammate Fury, despite her engagement to his friend Silver Scarab. Many other characters make note of this, though none of them begrudge Al, and actually feel sorry for him because he will inevitably have his heart broken. Looking up to her even as children, he eventually proposes when Hector is killed and she is left pregnant, so that she will not be alone. She turns him down, saying that she prefers them to be friends. He also has a brief flirtation with the second Wildcat Yolanda Montez, but things never developed between them. During his time with the League, he dates Fire, but he discontinues the relationship because she is not Jewish — even though this did not stop his earlier or later crushes.

His relationship with Stargirl is even more complex. While Stargirl has shown some romantic feelings for Atom Smasher in the past, there is never any reciprocation on his part. Later issues clearly establish Stargirl's true feelings, as various friends (such as Billy Batson (Captain Marvel) or her friend Mary) accuse her of liking Al, and she promises to wait for him upon his return from prison. When Al is killed temporarily by The Spectre, she reveals the depths of her feelings for him, weeping over his dead body. Albert finally acknowledges his own feelings when he rejoins the JSA to fight Black Adam, admitting that Billy Batson deserves her far more than Al himself does, in a regretful tone. Al's teammates realize the couple's mutual attraction once they start openly fawning over each other in public, and while Power Girl is supportive ("Go rescue your fair maiden"), the elder members force Al to turn Courtney down due to the age difference. This leaves Al melancholy, and Courtney runs off crying. Later issues of JSA: All-Stars reveal the two still love each other, but after Johnny Sorrow mimics Al to force a kiss from the young girl, they both recognize the need for "space". In Injustice: Gods Among Us, Year 5 Annual, (Injustice is outside of the regular DC universe continuity) he's revealed to be in a relationship with Giganta, but they both frequently argue and bicker, leading to them getting into huge fights. According to Green Lantern, they argue and bicker a lot, but they always end up making up. While cleaning up Metropolis, the 2 of them argue over a metal girder and start fighting, trashing half of the city.

Other versions
Al Rothstein / Atom-Smasher appears in Kingdom Come as a member of Superman's Justice League.

In other media

Television

 A character partially based on Albert Rothstein / Atom Smasher named Tom Turbine appears in the Justice League episode "Legends", voiced by Ted McGinley. Turbine is a superhero from an alternate universe and member of the Justice Guild of America. During his time as a superhero, he battled the Injustice Guild and died alongside the rest of the JGA during a war that destroyed most of their world. Years later, psionic metahuman Ray Thompson recreated the JGA as part of an illusion before the heroes "die" a second time to defeat him. According to series producer Bruce Timm, Turbine was based primarily on Al Pratt, with elements of Atom Smasher and Superman.
 Atom Smasher makes minor non-speaking appearances in Justice League Unlimited as a member of an expanded Justice League.
 A villainous Earth-2 version of Albert Rothstein / Atom Smasher appears in The Flash episode "The Man Who Saved Central City", portrayed by Adam Copeland. While Eobard Thawne listed the Earth-1 version of Rothstein as a casualty of his particle accelerator accident in a previous episode, the latter was retroactively stated to have been in Hawaii at the time and thus never acquired powers. The Earth-2 Rothstein kills his Earth-1 counterpart before attempting to do the same to the Flash on Zoom's behalf, having been promised that he will be able to return to his native Earth, only to be defeated and killed.

Film
Albert Rothstein / Atom Smasher appears in the DC Extended Universe film Black Adam (2022), portrayed by Noah Centineo. This version is a member of the Justice Society who received his suit and mantle from his uncle Al Pratt.

Video games
Atom Smasher makes a cameo appearance in Injustice: Gods Among Us, in the background of the Hall of Justice stage while fighting Giganta.

Toys
 Atom Smasher was rendered as an action figure for Mattel's Justice League Unlimited toyline in the summer of 2005.
 In February 2009, Atom Smasher was featured as the Collect-and-Connect figure of the DC Universe Classics line's seventh wave.

References

External links
 Atom Smasher at Comic Vine

Characters created by Jerry Ordway
Characters created by Roy Thomas
Comics characters introduced in 1983
DC Comics characters who are shapeshifters
DC Comics characters who can move at superhuman speeds
DC Comics characters with superhuman strength
DC Comics male superheroes
DC Comics metahumans
Fictional American Jews in comics
Fictional characters who can change size
Fictional characters with density control abilities
Fictional characters with superhuman durability or invulnerability
Fictional giants
Earth-Two
Jewish superheroes